Richard Bickerton may refer to:
Sir Richard Bickerton, 1st Baronet (1727–1792), British Royal Navy admiral
Sir Richard Bickerton, 2nd Baronet (1759–1832), his son, British Royal Navy admiral
Richard F. Bickerton, British-born judge and politician in Hawaii

See also
Bickerton (surname)